Anzoátegui is a town and municipality in the Tolima Department of Colombia. The population of the municipality was 9,700 as of the 1993 census.

Municipalities of Tolima Department